Cheiranthera is a genus of ten species of flowering plants in the family Pittosporaceae and are all endemic to Australia. The following is a list of species accepted by the Australian Plant Census as at April 2020:
 Cheiranthera alternifolia  E.M.Benn. – S.A., (presumed extinct in Vic.)
 Cheiranthera borealis (E.M.Benn.) L.Cayzer & Crisp – Qld., N.S.W.
 Cheiranthera brevifolia F.Muell. – W.A.
 Cheiranthera filifolia Turcz. – W.A.
 Cheiranthera linearis A.Cunn. ex Lindl. – N.S.W., A.C.T., Vic.  
 Cheiranthera parviflora Benth. – W.A.
 Cheiranthera preissiana Putt. – W.A.
 Cheiranthera simplicifolia (E.M.Benn.) L.Cayzer & Crisp – W.A.
 Cheiranthera telfordii L.Cayzer & Crisp – N.S.W.
 Cheiranthera volubilis Benth. – S.A.

References 

Pittosporaceae
Apiales genera
Apiales of Australia
Taxa named by Allan Cunningham (botanist)